Be Careful, Grandma! is a 1960 Soviet comedy film directed by Nadezhda Kosheverova.

Plot 
The film tells about a girl and her active and stubborn grandmother, who want to build a new House of Culture and attract Komsomol members for this.

Cast 
 Faina Ranevskaya as Yelena Timofeyevna - babushka (as F. Ranevskaya)
 Ariadna Shengelaia as Lena (as A. Shengelaya)
 Lyudmila Markeliya as Shura - malenkaya (as L. Markeliya)
 Svetlana Kharitonova as Shura - bolshaya (as S. Kharitonova)
 Nina Urgant as Aleksandra (as N. Urgant)
 Yulian Panich as Vasya Kazachkov (as Yu. Panich)
 Leonid Bykov as Lyosha Shtykov (as L. Bykov)
 Leonid Satanovskiy as Nikolay (as L. Satanovskiy)

References

External links 
 

1960 films
1960s Russian-language films
Soviet comedy films
1960 comedy films
Films directed by Nadezhda Kosheverova